Less to Heaven is the seventh studio album by the American band Psyclon Nine. It was officially released through Metropolis Records on August 19, 2022 (originally scheduled for August 5, 2022). Psyclon Nine embarked on a month-long U.S. tour in support of the album, from June 7 to July 3, 2022, with support from Seven Factor and Our Frankenstein. They will also perform at the 2022 Dracula's Ball on October 28 with dark wave artist Ships in the Night.

Track listing

Personnel
Psyclon Nine
 Nero Bellum – vocals, all instruments

References

2022 albums
Psyclon Nine albums